Hyalurga urioides is a moth of the family Erebidae. It was described by Schaus in 1910. It is found in Costa Rica, Guatemala, Belize, Panama, Ecuador and Peru.

References

Hyalurga
Moths described in 1910